Wakíŋyaŋ Čík’ala (Little Thunder)(1820-1879) was a Brulé Lakota chief. He took over as chief of the Brulé after the death of Conquering Bear by U.S. Army soldiers in a dispute about a wandering Mormon cow in 1854, which had prompted the Grattan Massacre of approximately 30 U.S. Army troops on August 19, 1854 and led to the First Sioux War.  The U.S. Army sent 600 troops led by Brevet Gen. William S. Harney to Little Thunder's village on Blue Water Creek, a tributary of the North Platte River in Nebraska, near what is now known as Ash Hollow State Historical Park. Little Thunder was wounded and captured during the Battle of Ash Hollow of September 3, 1855, in which approximately 86 Sioux (including women and children) were killed and another 70 captured. Little Thunder was then deposed, although his son would lead a rebellion in 1865, and a teenager who witnessed the massacre, Crazy Horse, would become a war leader two decades and defeat U.S. Cavalry at the Battle of Little Big Horn in 1876. Little Thunder lived his final years on the Rosebud Indian Reservation of the Dakota Territory.

References

Brulé people
Lakota leaders
1820 births
1879 deaths